This is a list of notable simulation games for all video game platforms.

Biological simulation 

Catlateral Damage
 Creatures series
 Creatures
 Creatures 2
 Creatures 3
 Dragonseeds
 Dragon Throne: Battle of Red Cliffs
 E.V.O.: Search for Eden
 Eco
 Empire of the Ants
 Evolution: The Game of Intelligent Life
 Lion
 Monster Rancher series
 Monster Rancher 2
 Monster Rancher Battle Card Game
 Monster Rancher Explorer
 Monster Rancher 3
 Monster Rancher 4
 Monster Rancher EVO
 Monster Rancher Advance
 Monster Rancher Advance 2
Niche – a genetics survival game
 Odell Lake
 Saurian (video game)
 Science Horizons Survival
 Seventh Cross Evolution
 SimAnt
 SimEarth: The Living Planet
 SimLife
 Spore
 Wolf

Social simulation 

 Aa Yakyū Jinsei Itchokusen
 Alter Ego
 America Daitōryō Senkyo
 Animal Crossing series
Chibi-Robo! series
Chibi-Robo!
Chibi-Robo!: Park Patrol
 Crime and Punishment
 Desperate Housewives: The Game
 Executive Suite
 GiFTPiA
 Gossip
 Jones in the Fast Lane
 Little Computer People
 My Life My Love
 Real Lives
 The Sims series
 The Sims (2000)
 The Sims: Livin' Large (2000)
 The Sims: House Party (2001)
 The Sims: Hot Date (2001)
 The Sims: Vacation (2002)
 The Sims: Unleashed (2002)
 The Sims: Superstar (2003)
 The Sims: Makin' Magic(2003)
 The Sims 2 (2004)
 The Sims 2: University (2005)
 The Sims 2: Nightlife (2005)
 The Sims 2: Open for Business (2006)
 The Sims 2: Pets (2006)
 The Sims 2: Seasons (2007)
 The Sims 2: Bon Voyage (2007)
 The Sims 2: FreeTime (2008)
 The Sims 2: Apartment Life (2009)
 The Sims 3 (2009)
 The Sims 3: World Adventures (2009)
 The Sims 3: Ambitions (2010)
 The Sims 3: Late Night (2010)
 The Sims 3: Generations (2011)
 The Sims 3: Pets (2011)
 The Sims 3: Showtime (2012)
 The Sims 3: Supernatural (2012)
 The Sims 3: Seasons (2012)
 The Sims 3: University Life (2012)
 The Sims 3: Island Paradise (2013)
 The Sims 3: Into the Future (2013)
 The Sims 4 (2014)
 The Sims 4: Get to Work (2015)
 The Sims 4: Get Together (2015)
 The Sims 4: City Living (2016)
 The Sims 4: Cats & Dogs (2017)
 The Sims 4: Seasons (2018)
 The Sims 4: Get Famous (2018)
 The Sims 4: Island Living (2019)
 The Sims 4: Discover University (2019)
 The Sims 4: Eco Lifestyle (2020)
 The Sims 4: Snowy Escape (2020)
 Singles series
 Singles: Flirt Up Your Life
 Singles 2: Triple Trouble
 Space Colony
 Trust & Betrayal: The Legacy of Siboot
Stardew Valley
 Viva Piñata series
 Viva Piñata (2006)
 Viva Piñata: Trouble in Paradise (2008)
 Viva Piñata: Pocket Paradise (2008)
 Wall Street Kid

Construction and management simulation

Business simulation 

 Virtonomics series

Airport management 

 Airline Tycoon (series)
 (1998) Airline Tycoon
 (2001) Airline Tycoon First Class
 (2002) Airline Tycoon Evolution
 (2003) Airline Tycoon Deluxe
 (2011) Airline Tycoon 2
 SimPort

City-building 

 Anno (series)
 (1998) Anno 1602 (in the US and Australia released as 1602 A.D.)
 (2003) Anno 1503 (known in the US as 1503 A.D.: The New World)
 (2006) Anno 1701
 (2007) Anno 1701: The Sunken Dragon
 (2007) Anno 1701: Dawn of Discovery
 (2009) Anno 1404, known in North America as Dawn of Discovery
 (2009) Anno 1404: Venice
 (2009) Anno: Create A New World
 (2011) Anno 2070
 (2013) Anno Online
 (2015) Anno 2205
 (2019) Anno 1800
 Cities XL series
Cities XL
 Cities XL 2011
 Cities XL 2012
 Cities: Skylines (2015)
 Constructor (video game) – PC (1997)
 Islanders (video game) – PC (2019)
 RimWorld
 The SimCity series – PC (1989–present)
 SimCity
 SimCity 2000
 SimCity 3000
 SimCity 4
 SimCity 5
 Surviving Mars – 2018
 Outpost
 Outpost 2
 Townscaper – 2020
 Utopia: The Creation of a Nation – 1991

God games 

Black & White – 2001
Black and White 2 – 2005
Dyson Sphere Program – 2021
From Dust
Godus
Reus – 2013

Government simulation 

 Balance of Power
 Commander in Chief
 Masters of the World (video game)
 CyberJudas
 Democracy series
 Democracy
 Democracy 2
 Democracy 3
 eRepublik
 Floor 13
 Geo Political Simulator series
 Global Domination
 Hidden Agenda
 President Elect
 President Forever 2008 + Primaries
 The Cardinal of the Kremlin
 The Global Dilemma: Guns or Butter
 The Political Machine
 Tropico series
 Tropico
 Tropico 2
 Tropico 3
 Tropico 4
 Tropico 5
 Tropico 6
 Europa Universalis series
Europa Universalis
Europa Universalis II
Europa Universalis III
Europa Universalis: Rome
Europa Universalis IV
 Superpower series
Superpower
 Superpower 2

Sports management

Baseball 

 Baseball Mogul series
 Diamond Mind Baseball series
 MicroLeague Baseball
 Out of the Park Baseball series
PureSim Baseball series
PureSim Baseball 2007

Cricket 

 International Cricket Captain series
 Don Bradman Cricket

Football (American) 

 Football Mogul series
 Front Office Football series
 Front Page Sports Football
 Madden NFL series
 Madden NFL '95
 Madden NFL '96
 NFL Head Coach

Football (Association) 

 Championship Manager series
Championship Manager
Championship Manager 93/94
Championship Manager 2
Championship Manager 96/97
Championship Manager: Season 97/98
Championship Manager 3
Championship Manager: Season 01/02
Championship Manager 4
Championship Manager: Season 03/04
Championship Manager 5
Championship Manager 2006
Championship Manager 2007
Championship Manager (PSP)
 FIFA Manager series
 FIFA Soccer Manager
 FIFA Manager 06
 FIFA Manager 07
 FIFA Manager 08
 FIFA series
 Football Manager series
 Football Manager
 Football Manager 2005
 Football Manager 2006
 Football Manager 2007
 Football Manager 2008
 Football Manager 2009
 Football Manager 2010
 Football Manager 2011
 Football Manager 2012
 Football Manager 2013
 Football Manager 2014
 Football Manager 2015
 Football Manager 2016
 Football Manager 2017
 Football Manager 2018
 Football Manager 2019
 Football Manager 2020
 Football Manager 2021

 Gazza's Superstar Soccer
 Hattrick
 Let's Make a Soccer Team!
 LMA Manager series
 O'Leary Manager 2000
 Player Manager
 Premier Manager series
 Premier Manager
 Premier Manager 2
 Premier Manager 3
 Premier Manager 64
 Tactical Manager
 Ultimate Soccer Manager
 Winning Eleven

Hockey 

 Eastside Hockey Manager series
 Eastside Hockey Manager
 NHL Eastside Hockey Manager
 NHL Eastside Hockey Manager 2005
 NHL Eastside Hockey Manager 2007
 Franchise Hockey Manager

Racing 
 Formula One series
 F1 series (Codemasters)
 Grand Prix Manager series
 Grand Prix Manager
 Grand Prix Manager 2
 Grand Prix World
 Motorsport Manager

Miscellaneous 

 Blockland
 Blocksworld
 Chaos League
 Extreme Warfare / Extreme Wrestling
 Farming Simulator
 FortressCraft
 Gladius
 Minecraft
 Roblox
 Title Bout Championship Boxing
 Total Miner

Vehicle simulation

Bus simulation 
The Bus
Bus Driver
Bus Simulator 16
Bus Simulator 18
Bus Simulator 21
City Bus Simulator
Desert Bus
Fernbus Simulator
Tourist Bus Simulator

Car simulation 
BeamNG.drive

Tank simulation 
 World War II Online (2001–2012, virtual battlefield)
 M4 (1992)
 Panzer Front
 Steel Beasts
 Steel Fury
 Wild Metal Country (A.K.A. Wild Metal)
 World of Tanks
 War Thunder

Truck simulation 
 18 Wheels of Steel series
 American Truck Simulator
 Hard Truck series
 King of the Road
 Euro Truck Simulator
 Euro Truck Simulator 2
 German Truck Simulator
 UK Truck Simulator
 Rig 'n' Roll
 Rigs of Rods
 Street Cleaning Simulator
 Spintires
 MudRunner
 SnowRunner

Flight simulation 

 Ace Combat series
 Air Combat
 Ace Combat 2
 Ace Combat 3: Electrosphere
 Ace Combat 04: Shattered Skies
 Ace Combat 5: The Unsung War
 Ace Combat 6: Fires of Liberation
 Ace Combat Advance
 Ace Combat X: Skies of Deception
 Ace Combat Zero: The Belkan War
 Ace Combat 7: Skies Unknown
 Su-27 Flanker (video game)
 Flanker 2.0
 Flanker 2.5
 Lock On: Modern Air Combat
 Digital Combat Simulator
 Falcon series
 Falcon 4.0
 Falcon 4.0: Allied Force
 FlightGear
 Fly! series
 Fly!
 Fly! II
 Flight Unlimited series
 Flight Unlimited
 Flight Unlimited II
 Flight Unlimited III
 IL-2 Sturmovik series
 Kerbal Space Program
 Microsoft Combat Flight Simulator series
 Microsoft Combat Flight Simulator
 Combat Flight Simulator 2
 Combat Flight Simulator 3: Battle for Europe
 SubLogic Flight Simulator series
FS1 Flight Simulator
Flight Simulator II (Sublogic)
 Microsoft Flight Simulator series
 Flight Simulator 1.0
 Flight Simulator 2.0
 Flight Simulator 3.0
 Flight Simulator 4.0
 Flight Simulator 5.0
 Flight Simulator 5.1
 Flight Simulator 95
 Flight Simulator 98
 Flight Simulator 2000
 Flight Simulator 2002
 Flight Simulator 2004: A Century of Flight
 Microsoft Flight Simulator X
 Microsoft Flight
 Flight Simulator 2020
 Microsoft Space Simulator
 X-Plane series

Miscellaneous
 FlightGear
 Infinite Flight
 Top Gun: Danger Zone
 World of Warplanes
 War Thunder
 Prepar3D
 WarBirds

Farming Simulation 

 Farming Simulator

Ship simulation 
Ship Simulator series
Ship Simulator Extremes
 Virtual Sailor
 Deadliest Catch: Alaskan Storm
 World of Warships (2015)

Racing simulation 

 ARCA Sim Racing
Assetto Corsa Series
Assetto Corsa
Assetto Corsa Competizione
 Codemasters F1 Series
F1 2010
F1 2011
F1 2012
F1 2013
F1 2014
F1 2015
F1 2016
F1 2017
F1 2018
F1 2019
F1 2020
F1 2021
 Colin McRae Rally Series
 Colin McRae Rally
 Colin McRae Rally 2.0
 Colin McRae Rally 3
 Colin McRae Rally 04
 Colin McRae Rally 2005
 Dirt Series
 Colin McRae: Dirt
 Colin McRae: Dirt 2
 Dirt 3
 Dirt 4
 Dirt 5
 Dirt: Showdown
 Dirt Rally
 Dirt Rally 2.0
 EA Sports F1 Series
F1 Challenge '99–'02
 Enthusia Professional Racing
 Forza Motorsport Series
 Forza Motorsport
 Forza Motorsport 2
 Forza Motorsport 3
 Forza Motorsport 4
 Forza Motorsport 5
 Forza Motorsport 6
 Forza Motorsport 7
 Geoff Crammond's Grand Prix Series
 Formula One Grand Prix
 Grand Prix 2
 Grand Prix 3
 Grand Prix 3 2000
 Grand Prix 4
 Gran Turismo (series) Series
 Gran Turismo
 Gran Turismo 2
 Gran Turismo 3: A-Spec
 Gran Turismo Concept
 Gran Turismo 4 Prologue
 Gran Turismo 4
 Gran Turismo HD Concept
 Gran Turismo 5 Prologue
 Gran Turismo 5
 Gran Turismo 6
 Gran Turismo Sport
 Grand Prix Legends
 GT Legends
 GTR Series
 GTR - FIA GT Racing Game
 GTR - FIA GT Racing Game 2
 Indianapolis 500: The Simulation
 IndyCar Racing Series
 IndyCar Racing
 IndyCar Racing II
 iRacing.com
 Live For Speed
 Mobil 1 Rally Championship
 NASCAR Racing Series
 NASCAR Racing
 NASCAR Racing 2
 NASCAR Grand National Series Expansion Pack
 NASCAR Legends
 NASCAR Racing 1999 Edition
 NASCAR Craftsman Truck Racing
 NASCAR Racing 3
 NASCAR Racing 4
 NASCAR Racing 2002 Season
 NASCAR Racing 2003 Season
 NASCAR Heat Series
 NASCAR Heat
 NASCAR: Dirt to Daytona
 netKar Pro
 Project CARS series
Project CARS
Project CARS 2
Project CARS 3
 Need For Speed Series
 RACE Series
 RACE - The Official WTCC Game
 RACE 07 - The Official WTCC Game
 Formula Raceroom
 GTR Evolution
 STCC – The Game
 rFactor Series
 rFactor
 rFactor 2
 Richard Burns Rally

Miscellaneous
 My Summer Car
 Racer
 Raceroom Racing Experience
 Rally Trophy
 Richard Burns Rally
 Simraceway
 SODA Off-Road Racing
 Spirit of Speed 1937
 Stunt Car Driver
 The Open Racing Cars Simulator
 Viper Racing

Submarine simulation 
 688 Attack Sub
 Jane's Combat Simulations: 688(I) Hunter/Killer
 Aces of the Deep
 AquaNox
 Dangerous Waters
 Enigma: Rising Tide
 Gato (computer game)
 The Hunt for Red October (1987)
 Red Storm Rising
 SSN-21 Seawolf
 Shells of Fury
 Silent Hunter
 Silent Hunter II
 Silent Hunter III
 Silent Hunter 4: Wolves of the Pacific
 Silent Hunter 4: The U-Boat Missions (add-on expansion pack)
 Silent Hunter 5: Battle of the Atlantic
 Silent Service (video game)
 Silent Service II
 Silent Steel
 Sub Battle Simulator
 Sub Command
 Tom Clancy's SSN
 Treasures of the Deep
 WolfPack
 Sub Hunt

Train simulations 
 Mini Metro
 Microsoft Train Simulator
 OpenBVE
 Train Fever
 Train Simulator 2013
 Trainz Simulator 12
 Train Simulator
 Train Sim World
 World of Subways
 Densha de Go!

Other simulations

Programming Games

 Colobot
 TIS-100

Trade simulation

 Discovery: In the Steps of Columbus
 High Seas Trader
 Merchant Prince series
 Merchant Prince
 Machiavelli: The Prince
 Merchant Prince II
The Patrician
Patrician II: Quest for Power
Patrician III
Port Royale 2
 Uncharted Waters series
 Uncharted Waters
 Uncharted Waters: New Horizons
 Mobile Uncharted Waters II
 Daikoukai Jidai Gaiden
 Daikoukai Jidai III: Costa Del Sol
 Daikoukai Jidai IV: Porto Estado
 Daikoukai Jidai IV: Rota Nova
 Uncharted Waters Online
 Uncharted Waters Online La Frontera
 Trade Empires

Photo simulation 
Afrika (PlayStation 3)
Pokémon Snap (Nintendo 64)
Gekibo: Gekisha Boy (PC Engine)
The Cameraman: Gekisha Boy Omakefu (PlayStation)
Polaroid Pete (PlayStation 2)
Rilakkuma na Mainichi (Game Boy Advance)
Wild Earth: African Safari (Wii)
Sea Life Safari (Xbox 360)

Medical simulation 
Emergency Room series
Hospital Tycoon
LifeSigns: Surgical Unit
Life & Death
Life & Death II: The Brain
 Plague Inc.
Theme Hospital
Trauma Center series
Trauma Center: Under the Knife
Trauma Center: Second Opinion
Trauma Center: New Blood
Trauma Center: Under the Knife 2
Trauma Team
Surgeon Simulator 2013
Microsurgeon (video game)

Motion simulators with screens 
 Typhoon (simulator)

See also
List of city-building video games
List of business simulation video games
List of roller coaster related video games
Simulated reality

References 

Simulation
Simulation video games